Postmaster is a 2016 Bengali film based on Rabindranath Tagore's 1891 short story of the same name, directed and written by Srijon Bardhan, produced by Sri Media. The motion picture had its premiere on 7 December 2015 at the 4th Delhi International Film Festival, later being released commercially on 24 June 2016 at Star Theatres, Kolkata, West Bengal, India. The film was also selected at the 14th Chennai International Film Festival, in 2017.

Cast 
 Ishan Mazumdar
 Pujarini Ghosh
 Biswajit Chakraborty
 Tulika Basu
 Mousumi Saha
 Kalyan Chatterjee
 Bodhiswatya Mazumdar
 Biplab Chatterjee
 Rohan Bhattacharya

Plot 
Young spirited Nanda Sen leaves his city home of old Calcutta and luxury of urban life to join as the village Postmaster of Plassey where his life was comforted with the service and company of orphan low-caste housemaid Ratna and his only friend there- school teacher Rabibabu. Ratna's charm appealed to him and Nanda married her against society and family. Succumbed to his father's last wish to marry a suitable match, Nanda landed in a crisis and escaped his desired family life. Nanda couldn't overcome this sin and finds solace in the next life.

Music 
Record Label: Times Music.

References

External links 
 
 

Bengali-language Indian films
2010s Bengali-language films
2016 films
Films based on works by Rabindranath Tagore